Abily is an old Russian male first name. Included into various, often handwritten, church calendars throughout the 17th–19th centuries, it was omitted from the official Synodal Menologium at the end of the 19th century. It is possibly derived from "" (Abila)—the name of one of the Pillars of Hercules associated with modern Monte Hacho on the north coast of Africa.

References

Notes

Sources
А. В. Суперанская (A. V. Superanskaya). "Словарь русских имён" (Dictionary of Russian Names). Издательство Эксмо. Москва, 2005. 

Russian masculine given names